The 2016 Boys' Youth South American Volleyball Championship was the 20th edition of the Boys' Youth South American Volleyball Championship, organised by South America's governing volleyball body, the Confederación Sudamericana de Voleibol (CSV).

Competing nations
The following national teams participated:

Preliminary round

Pool A

|}

|}

Pool B

|}

|}

Final round

5th–6th classification

|}

Championship

Semifinals

|}

Third place match

|}

Final

|}

Final standing

References

South American Volleyball Championship